Yoko may refer to:

People 
 Yoko (name), a Japanese feminine given name; variants include Yōko and Yohko

 Yoko Gushiken (具志堅 用高, born 1955), Japanese professional boxer
 Yoko Taro (横尾 太郎, born 1970), Japanese video game director
 Madam Yoko (1849–1906), leader of the Mende people in Sierra Leone
 Yoko Ono (小野 洋子, born 1933), Japanese multimedia artist and wife of John Lennon
 Yoko Yamada (山田 よう子 or 山田 洋子, born 1979), Japanese female professional wrestler

Places 
 Yoko, Benin, an arrondissement in the Plateau department of Benin
 Yoko Commune, a commune in the Mbam-et-Kim department of the Centre Region in Cameroon

Other uses 
 "Yoko" (Flight of the Conchords), fourth episode of the HBO television series Flight of the Conchords (2007)
 "Yoko", a version of the song "Paradise" by Berner that appears on the 2014 reissue of The White Album
 Yoko! Jakamoko! Toto! (2003), British animated series for children
 Yoko (album) (2003), final studio album released by US indie rock band Beulah
 Yoko (TV series), a Russian-Spanish 3D animated television series

See also 
 "The Ballad of John and Yoko", a 1969 song by The Beatles
 Yuki (disambiguation)